Karin Reichert-Frisch (born 17 January 1941) is a German sprinter. She competed in the women's 100 metres at the 1968 Summer Olympics.

References

1941 births
Living people
Athletes (track and field) at the 1964 Summer Olympics
Athletes (track and field) at the 1968 Summer Olympics
German female sprinters
Olympic athletes of the United Team of Germany
Olympic athletes of West Germany
Place of birth missing (living people)
Olympic female sprinters